Webuye, previously named Broderick Falls, is an industrial town in Bungoma County, Kenya.  Located on the main road to Uganda, the town is home to the Pan African Paper Mills, the largest paper factory in the region, as well as a number of heavy-chemical and sugar manufacturers.  The area is heavily populated and is used mainly for subsistence agriculture.  The area around Webuye is home to the Bukusu and Tachoni tribes.  The town has an urban population of 19,600 (1999 census) and 22,507 in total according to the GeoNames geographical database.

Villages near Webuye include Lugulu, Milo, Maraka and Misikhu. Webuye is home to the Broderick Falls of Nzoia River. In Maraka, there exists the famed "mfunje" suspension bridge which consists of rickety timber strips joined together with some metal wires, precariously dangling across River Nzoia. It attracts a considerable number of both local and foreign tourists who enjoy the thrill of crossing the river on the shaky locally-made bridge.

Webuye has in the recent past also seen the establishment of some important education centres, including a constituent college campus of the Masinde Muliro University of Science and Technology, and a Kenya Medical Training college Campus.

Webuye hosts Webuye Refferal Hospital that is a leading medical facility in the County 

The town's economy was hit hard by the dwindling fortunes of Pan African Paper Mills, which was closed down in 2008.  Efforts have been put in place by successive regimes since then to reopen the paper mill, but without success.
The nearest tourist attraction is the Nabuyole waterfalls on River Nzoia. The falls are seven kilometres from Webuye and provide a cool breeze to tourists.

Naming
In the pre-independence times, Webuye was known as Broderick Falls, after the first white man to visit the nearby Nabuyole falls on River Nzoia.  Today, it's named after a cobbler who repaired shoes for railway workers.

Railways
The town is located on the main railway from Mombasa to Uganda. The area around the town is inhabited by both the Bukusu and the Tachoni.

Statistics
 Webuye has a tropical climate, and the land around it is used mainly for subsistence agriculture. Average annual temperature is 24 °C / 75.2 °F.

References

Populated places in Bungoma County